Umbiram is a rural locality in the Toowoomba Region, Queensland, Australia.

History 
The locality takes its name from the railway station name, on the Millmerran railway line, which is an Aboriginal word (possibly from the Gooneburra language) meaning  winding creek.

Flemington Provisional School opened on 18 May 1908. On 1 January 1909, it became Flemington State School. It closed in 1914, but reopened in 1915. In 1918, it was renamed Umbiram State School. It closed on 12 December 1975.

References 

Toowoomba Region
Localities in Queensland